Richard Cameron may refer to:

 Richard Cameron (Covenanter) (1648?–1680), English leader of the Covenanters
 Richard Cameron (writer) (born 1948), English playwright
 Richard Cameron (Kansas politician) (1925–2009), American politician and member of the Kansas House of Representatives
 Richard Cameron, member of Dutch electronic music duo Arling & Cameron
 Richard Cameron, character in Dead Poets Society